The Whale virus is a computer virus discovered on July 1, 1990. The file size, at 9,216 bytes, was for its time the largest virus ever discovered. It is known for using several advanced "stealth" methods.

Description
After the file becomes resident in the system memory below the 640k DOS boundary, the operator will experience total system slow down as a result of the virus' polymorphic code. Symptoms include video flicker to the screen writing very slowly.  Files may seem to "hang" even though they will eventually execute correctly.  This is just a product of the total system slow down within the system's memory.

It was reported that one infected program displayed the following message when run:
             THE WHALE IN SEARCH OF THE 8 FISH
             I AM '~knzyvo}' IN HAMBURG addr error D9EB,02
Shifting the letters of "~knzyvo}" left in the ASCII table by 10 characters turns the string into "tadpoles".

See also
Computer virus
Comparison of computer viruses

References

External links
 McAfee Virus Description
 F-Secure Virus Description

DOS file viruses
Crime in Hamburg
Cybercrime in Germany